Herman Hendrik ter Balkt (17 September 1938 – 9 March 2015) was a Dutch poet. He won numerous awards throughout his career, among them the 1988 Jan Campert Prize, the 1998 Constantijn Huygens Prize and the 2003 P. C. Hooft Award. He was born in  Usselo, Overijssel and died in Nijmegen.

Bibliography

English 
 H.H. ter Balkt: How to start a wine cellar. Selected poems 1969-1984. Transl. by Wanda Boeke [et al.], introd. by Johanna H. Prins.  Amsterdam, Bridges Books, 1984.

Dutch 
 1969 - Boerengedichten ofwel Met de boerenbijl
 1970 - Uier van het Oosten
 1972 - De gloeilampen, De varkens
 1973 - Groenboek
 1973 - Zwijg (novel, under the pseudonym Foel Aos of Habakuk II)
 1974 - Zoals de honingappel
 1974 - Ikonen
 1975 - Oud gereedschap mensheid moe
 1976 - De vliegen dragen de zomer
 1977 - Helgeel landjuweel
 1978 - Joseph Beuys
 1979 - Waar de burchten stonden en de snoek zwom
 1982 - Machines!: maai ons niet, maai de rogge
 1983 - Hemellichten
 1986 - Verkeerde raadhuizen
 1987 - Aardes deuren
 1990 - Het Strand van Amsterdam
 1990 - In de kalkbranderij van het absolute
 1991 - Laaglandse hymnen
 1992 - Ode aan de grote kiezelwal en andere gedichten
 1993 - Het bonenstro
 1998 - Tegen de bijlen: oden en anti-oden
 2000 - In de waterwingebieden (poems 1953-1999)
 2002 - Laaglandse hymnen II
 2003 - Anti-canto's
 2003 - Laaglandse hymnen I - III
 2004 - Anti-canto's en De Astatica
 2007 - Zwijg / De gedenatureerde delta (novel from 1973 and collected critics)
 2008 - Vuur
 2010 - Onder de bladerkronen
 2011 - Vliegtuigmagneet
 2014 - Hee hoor mij ho simultaan op de brandtorens (collected poems)

References

External links

1938 births
2015 deaths
20th-century Dutch novelists
20th-century Dutch poets
21st-century Dutch poets
Constantijn Huygens Prize winners
Dutch male poets
People from Enschede
P. C. Hooft Award winners
Dutch male novelists
20th-century Dutch male writers
21st-century Dutch male writers